Falcón Zulia State (Estado Falcón – Zulia) was a state of Venezuela created by initiative of president Antonio Guzmán Blanco.

History 

1881: Ante las presiones del estado Zulia por mayor autonomía el presidente Antonio Guzmán Blanco decreta su unión con el estado Falcón y el cambio de capital primero a Casigua y luego a Capatárida bajo la figura de Estado Falcón Zulia. La capital de la sección Zulia fue Maracaibo, y Coro la de la sección Falcón.
1883: Zulia section receives from Falcón section the Democracia Parish (Quisiro) which was incorporated into Altagracia Canton.
1890: President Raimundo Andueza Palacio gives autonomy to Zulia State and Maracaibo becomes the capital. Zulia section disappears and Quisiro definitely becomes part of the state.

Territory

1881 - 1883 

As repression to the calls against centralism, president Antonio Guzmán Blanco joined Falcón State and Zulia State into a combined state called Falcón-Zulia with the intent that Maracaibo had less autonomy. The capital was transferred to Casigua and later to Capatárida.  Zulia became only a sub-region of the new state. In 1890 President  Raimundo Andueza Palacio reestablished the autonomy of Zulia State with Maracaibo as its capital again. El Zulia volvió a sus fronteras de 1881.
In the map, the Zulia sub-region (and former State) is shown in red, which had Maracaibo as its former capital; the Falcón sub-region (and former State) is in brown.  Capatárida is located in the western coat in Galcón State near the border with Zulia State almost equidistant between the former (and now current) capitals of Falcón and Zulia States, respectively, the cities of Coro and Maracaibo.

1883 - 1890 

The Zulia section, in red, receives Democracia Parish from Falcón.

Subdivisions 

The state is divided into 2 secciones/sections:

 Sección Zulia
 Sección Falcón

The sections are divided into cantons.

Cantons of Zulia 

 Altagracia Canton
 Fraternidad Canton
 Gibraltar Canton
 Maracaibo Canton
 Perijá Canton

Cantons of Falcón 

 Coro Canton
 Cumarebo Canton
 Costa Arriba Canton
 Casigua Canton
 San Luis Canton
 Paraguaná Canton

States of Venezuela
States and territories established in 1881
States and territories disestablished in 1890
1881 establishments in Venezuela
1890 disestablishments in Venezuela